Hasanabad-e Kohneh may refer to:
 Hasanabad-e Kohneh, Isfahan
 Hasanabad-e Kohneh, Kurdistan
 Hasanabad-e Kohneh, Razavi Khorasan